FSHS may refer to:

 Father, Son, and Holy Spirit

Schools
 Fairfax Senior High School, in Los Angeles, California, United States
 Fairmont Senior High School, in Fairmont, West Virginia, United States
 Fargo South High School, in Fargo, North Dakota, United States
 Fort Saskatchewan Senior High School, in Fort Saskatchewan, Alberta, Canada
 Fort Stockton High School, in Fort Stockton, Texas, United States
 Fort Street High School, in Sydney, New South Wales, Australia
 Franklin Senior High School (Louisiana), in Franklin, Louisiana
 Franklin-Simpson High School, in Franklin, Kentucky, United States
 Fremont Senior High School (Nebraska), in Fremont, Nebraska, United States
 Lawrence Free State High School, in Lawrence, Kansas, United States
 National Fengshan Senior High School, in Fengshan District, Kaohsiung City, Taiwan

See also 
 FSH (disambiguation)